Raeford Historic District is a national historic district in Raeford, Hoke County, North Carolina. The district encompasses 48 contributing buildings and two contributing structures in the central business district of Raeford. The commercial and institutional buildings, residences, and transportation-related resources include notable examples of Queen Anne- and Colonial Revival-style architecture built after 1897. Notable buildings include the B. R. and Margaret Gatlin House (c. 1903), J.W. and Christina McLauchlin House (c. 1905), Raeford Furniture Company (c. 1925), Hoke Drug (c. 1911), Bank of Raeford (1911), Aberdeen & Rockfish Railroad Passenger Depot (c. 1910, 1942), Johnson-Thomas Building (c. 1900, 1955), and Davis Sinclair Station (c. 1956).

It was listed on the National Register of Historic Places in 2006.

References

Historic districts on the National Register of Historic Places in North Carolina
Queen Anne architecture in North Carolina
Colonial Revival architecture in North Carolina
Buildings and structures in Hoke County, North Carolina
National Register of Historic Places in Hoke County, North Carolina